In mathematics, in the realm of group theory, an IA automorphism of a group is an automorphism that acts as identity on the abelianization. The abelianization of a group is its quotient by its commutator subgroup. An IA automorphism is thus an automorphism that sends each coset of the commutator subgroup to itself.

The IA automorphisms of a group form a normal subgroup of the automorphism group. Every inner automorphism is an IA automorphism.

See Also
Torelli group

References

Group theory
Group automorphisms